Monno Medical College & Hospital (MoMC) is a non-profit private medical school in Bangladesh which was established in 2011. Its main campus is located beside the Dhaka-Aricha Highway at Monno City, Gilondo under Ghior Upazila of Manikganj district in Dhaka Division. It is affiliated with University of Dhaka.

It has a five-year course plan leading to a Bachelor of Medicine, Bachelor of Surgery (MBBS) degree. A one-year internship after graduation is compulsory for all graduates. The degree is recognised by the Bangladesh Medical and Dental Council(BMDC) and Ministry of Health, Bangladesh.

History
Harunar Rashid Khan Monno established Monno Medical College in 2011.

Campus

The main buildings on  the campus include ten-storied academic building; separate hostels for male students, female students, male interns and female interns, dormitory for doctors and professors; and Monno Medical College Hospital, the college's five-storey, 500-bed teaching hospital.

Organization and administration
The college is affiliated with Dhaka University as a constituent college. The chairman of the college is Afroza Khan Rita. The principal is Dr. Zahedul Karim Ahmad.

Academics
The college offers a five-year course of study, approved by the Bangladesh Medical and Dental Council (BMDC), leading to a Bachelor of Medicine, Bachelor of Surgery (MBBS) degree from Dhaka University. After passing the final professional examination, there is a compulsory one-year internship. The internship is a prerequisite for obtaining registration from the BMDC to practice medicine.

College infrastructures 
 
Academic facilities includes:

• Three Lecture Halls equipped with microphone system, OHP, Slide Projector and Whiteboard

• Six Tutorial Rooms- 1-2 rooms for one department

• Nine Laboratories- Histology-1, Phiology-1, Biochemistry-1, Phamacology-2, Pathology-2, Microbiology-2, provided with necessary equipment, microscope, histology slides, glass wares, reagents etc.

• One Dissection Hall- providing arrangements of dissection on four cadavers at a time. It also has space for demonstration of 75 students divided into three groups in four corners.

• Four Museums- Anatomy-1, Pathology-1, Community Medicine-1 and one for Forensic Medicine which contains a adequate number of specimen, charts and models.

• Medical Education Unit

Journal 

Monno Medical College publishes a Journal entitled "Journal of Monno Medical College," which is a peer reviewed biennial medical journal with different scientific research articles by the faculties of this medical college as well as the researchers of the different hospitals and Institutions.

Medical Education Unit

Training program for teachers are launched in this Medical education corner to develop teaching and research skills of the faculty members. Workshops, seminars on teaching and research methodology for the teachers usually take place here in the MEU.

Hospital infrastructures 
Monno Medical College Hospital is a five storied building having 142,000 sq.ft. floor space and functioning as a 500 bedded hospital with all  modern facilities for treatment of all kind of diseases with a group of highly qualified doctors. The outdoor and emergency treatments are furnished in a two storied building annexed to the main hospital. The hospital is situated in the door step of the college building.

Hostel facilities 
There are two four-storied hostels for the students. They are H.R. Khan Boys hostel and Hurun Nahar Girls Hostel. Besides Abdus Shukur Khan Doctors dormitory for intern-male, Rabeya Khatun Doctors Dormitory for intern-female, H.R. Khan Doctors quarter, Monno Professors Quarter respectively.

Admission
Admission for Bangladeshis to the MBBS programmes at all medical colleges in Bangladesh (government and private) is conducted centrally by the Directorate General of Health Services (DGHS). It administers a written multiple choice question exam simultaneously throughout the country. Candidates are admitted based primarily on their score on this test, although grades at Secondary School Certificate (SSC) and Higher Secondary School Certificate (HSC) level also play a part.
As of December 2017, the college is allowed to admit 80 students annually permitting 50% seats for foreigners.

References 

Medical colleges in Bangladesh
Hospitals in Bangladesh
Educational institutions established in 2011
2011 establishments in Bangladesh